Labe (German: Elbe) is a hamlet in Šumperk District, Olomouc Region, Czech Republic. It was founded by German settlers from Vrchlabí in 1521. Vrchlabí is called Hohen Elbe in German, thus the hamlet is obviously named after settlers' hometown. The Czech name is a consequence of bad understanding of the name's evolution. Officials believed the name was derived from the Elbe River, which is called Labe in Czech.  
The village was administered by the council of Nové Losiny for most of modern history. Labe has been administered by council of Jindřichov since 1976.

In 1945, the village population was expelled and was not fully repopulated. Only 8 houses remain. The hamlet is used as a recreational area.

References

Populated places in Šumperk District
Tourist attractions in the Olomouc Region